Metephestia is a monotypic snout moth genus described by George Hampson in 1901. Its only species, Metephestia simplicula, was described by Philipp Christoph Zeller in 1881. It is known from Colombia, southern Florida, Puerto Rico and the West Indies.

There are several generations per year.

The larvae feed on Indigofera species, including I. hirsuta, I. suffruticosa and I. tinctoria. Young larvae feed on unexpanded leaflets. Later, it ties together several leaflets with silk. They feed on the leaflets and bore into the petiolules of their host plant from within this shelter.

References

Moths described in 1881
Phycitinae
Monotypic moth genera
Moths of North America
Moths of South America
Taxa named by George Hampson
Pyralidae genera